The Princess Beatrice Hospital was a London hospital located in Earl's Court, which operated from 1887 to 1978, latterly as a maternity hospital.

History
The hospital was founded in 1887 as part of the celebrations of Queen Victoria’s Golden Jubilee, and originally called the Queen's Jubilee Hospital.  It was a small hospital of 14 beds, serving local people in need.

It was renamed several times in the early 20th century: 
 1907 - Kensington General Hospital
 1909 - Kensington and Fulham General Hospital
 1921 - Kensington, Fulham and Chelsea Hospital.

In 1930, the hospital was rebuilt by Aston Webb and Son to a design by Maurice Webb, and renamed in honour of Princess Beatrice, who laid the foundation stone. Her son, the Marquess of Carisbrooke, was President of the Hospital. The new hospital had up to 100 beds.  

From 1971, it operated as a dedicated maternity hospital. It closed in 1978.

Location
The hospital was located on corner of the Old Brompton Road and Finborough Road in Earl's Court. The 1887 hospital was based in Walwyn House (formerly called Brecknock Villa), which had been built for John Evan Thomas in 1842. A separate nurses’ home was provided on Finborough Road. 

As of 2020, the 1930 building is still standing, called Princess Beatrice House: it provides boarding accommodation for Kensington Park School. It was used as a filming location in the film An American Werewolf in London.

See also
 List of hospitals in England

References

1887 establishments in England
1887 in London
Buildings and structures in the Royal Borough of Kensington and Chelsea
Hospital buildings completed in 1930
Hospitals established in 1887
Defunct hospitals in London